Roger Masson (1 July 1894 in Zurich, 19 October 1967 in Chardonne), was a Swiss military officer who held the rank of Colonel-Brigadier and was head of the military intelligence service of Switzerland during the Second World War.

Life
Masson was the son of commercial director Jules Auguste and Eugénie Jeanneret. After completing his high school diploma and studying history at the University of Neuchâtel, Masson joined the Swiss Armed Forces, becoming an infantry soldier. In 1915 he was promoted to  lieutenant. In 1922, Masson was promoted to Captain, becoming an infantry instructor and by 1927 had become a member of the general staff. In 1928, he attended ETH Zurich where he studied military science, before continuing study at the École supérieure de guerre (military education institute) in Paris. In 1931, Masson became a co-editor and later editor-in-chief of the Swiss Military Review (Revue militaire suisse), which is a Swiss publication devoted to security and defence policy issues, a position he held until 1967. In 1935, Masson became a lecturer in the ETH Zurich. At the same time he was promoted Chief of Staff of Division 1.

Swiss military intelligence organisation
In 1936, Masson was put in charge of section 5 of General staff, which constituted the military intelligence service of the Swiss armed forces. In the years leading up to the war, he attempted to rebuild the section that had been virtually dissolved during the interwar period. This happened due to a number of complex reasons that included personal problems, lack of understanding, the general staff disliked having an intelligence agency and the false believe in the security provided by the League of Nations as well as the false belief that peace-time sources of information would be available during time of war or crises. With the approach of war, Chief of the Army General Staff Jakob Labhart issued an order on 22 February 1938 that contained instructions to rebuild army intelligence. Combined with an increased budget, it authorised Masson to form a strategic intelligence service, known as "Id". At the time, Masson recognised that Swiss Intelligence would no longer only offer intelligence on basic military facts but instead focus on all German operations. At the time that agency was still both underfunded and understaffed but it wasn't until the Munich crisis of August 1938 and the agencies successful intelligence operation that the Swiss Government recognised that it needed a well-funded intelligence service. Masson was able to use the money to open field-offices on the northern, western, and southern front as well as fund training for new agent  as well as recruit new informants.

On the 1 March 1942, Masson was promoted to Assistant Chief of Staff with the rank of colonel-brigadier. In January 1944, group Id was expanded to include the territorial service and renamed Group "Ib". This resulted in Masson commanding a unit consisting of 300,000 men.

Masson's contact with the German Reich

Origin of the Masson-Schellenberg contact
The first person who was directly involved in intiating the connection was Swiss lawyer and police fiction writer .. On 23 March 1938, Meyer purchased Wolfsburg Castle near Ermatingen that would eventually be used to host the meetings between Masson and Schellenberg. Meyer's responsibility as a lawyer was to evaluate, view and forward the reports of the intellegence collection points as well as monitor the domestic political situation. One of these tasks was to observe the National Movement of Switzerland, a Nazi umbrella organization, which was to merge various Nazi organizations into a National Socialist Unity Party.

Masson-Schellenberg meeting in Waldshut
The first meeting between Masson and Schellenberg came about through a chance coincidence rather than a planned action when in July 1942, Masson's deputy Werner Müller was invited to attend the International Criminal Police Commission in Berlin. In civlian life Müller was a policeman who directed the criminal investigation department in the city of Bern and had attended the commission several times before. He knew Reinhard Heydrich personally. Masson arranged for Müller to attend and assigned him four tasks, which were to establish contact with people associated with Heinrich Himmler, guage the mood of the SS, try for the release of Ernst Mörgeli and discuss bilateral issues regarding the police. Müller arrived in Berlin on 8 July 1942 where he was met by Schellenberg in his house in Wannsee. Müller was told that "Switzerland was not a burning issue for the Führer". Müller  mentioned Mörgeli, but couldn't pursue the matter futher. On 9 July 1942, Müller returned to Switzerland to report. He considered the meeting a success, believing that he had established a trusted contact in Germany. The meeting was also considered a success by Schellenberg who arranged a return visit, sending his assistant Hans Wilhelm Eggen to Zürich on 27 August 1942. Schellenberg sought to establish a private connection, essentially a special channel where trusted communication could be conducted that couldn't be addressed via diplomatic channels. While discussing the  military situation, Eggen recommended that Masson should meet Schellenberg. Masson was originally hesitant but finally agreed. 

On 8 September 1942, Masson left Switzerland and travelled across the Rhine to meet Schellenberg at a restaurant at the Waldshut train station. Schellenberg  was involved in a car accident that he survived and was late to the meeting. As this was their first meeting together,  both of the men worked to find common ground. Masson presented his requests one-by-one, looking to ensure the Swiss living in Germany were able to leave to join the Swiss army and to free  Mörgeli.

References

Citations

Bibliography
 

1894 births
1967 deaths
People from Zürich
Swiss military personnel by war
Swiss military personnel
Swiss military officers